1997 in professional wrestling describes the year's events in the world of professional wrestling.

List of notable promotions 
These promotions held notable shows in 1997.

Calendar of notable shows

January

February

March

April

May

June

July

August

September

October

November

December

Notable events
 January 4 - WWF Shotgun Saturday Night debuts live from New York City, New York 
 January 25 - New World Order has their nWo Souled Out Pay Per View live from Ceder Rapids, Iowa
 April 13 - ECW debuts live on Pay Per View for the first time with ECW Barely Legal from the ECW Arena in Philadelphia, Pennsylvania headlined with Sabu vs Tazz
 August 21 - The final WCW Clash of the Champions XXXV prime time special on TBS was held in Nashville, Tennessee headlined with Scott Hall and Randy Savage vs Lex Luger and Diamond Dallas Page.
 November 9 - The Montreal Screwjob
 After a long history of Memphis Wrestling the United States Wrestling Association closes its doors in November.
 December 30 - Jeff Jarrett defeated Blackjack Bradshaw on a WWF Raw is War taping in Uniondale, New York to win the NWA North American Heavyweight title .

Tournaments and accomplishments

AAA

WCW

WWF

Slammy Awards

Awards and honors

Pro Wrestling Illustrated

Wrestling Observer Newsletter

Wrestling Observer Newsletter awards

Wrestling Observer Newsletter Hall of Fame

Title changes

ECW

FMW

NJPW

WCW

WWF

Debuts

Uncertain debut date
Matt Bloom
Droz (wrestler) 
Evan Karagias 
Michael Cole
Justin Gabriel
Rene Dupree 
 February 7 – Ernest Miller
 March 10 – Dennis Rodman 
 March 15 – Ron Killings
 May 7 – Danny Doring 
 May 17 – Seiya Morohashi
 May 26 – Kazuki
 June 23 – Bill Goldberg
 July 6 – Shoichi Ichimiya
 August 2 
 Don Frye 
 Molly Holly
 October 26 – Test
 December 7 – Butterbean

Births
 February 9 – Dan Moloney
 February 28 - Ace Austin 
 March 7 – Tyler Bate
 April 5 – Dominik Mysterio
 June 1 – Black Warrior Jr. (d. 2022)
 June 5 – Gigi Dolin 
 June 9 – Myron Reed 
 August 2 – Austin Theory 
 September 3 – Hana Kimura (d. 2020)
 September 6 – Tsukushi Haruka
 October 24 – Bron Breakker

Retirements
 Águila Solitaria (1978–1997)
 Bull Nakano (1983–1997)
 Denny Brown (1980–1997)
 Jeff Gaylord (1985–1997)
 Jimmy Del Ray (1985–1997)
 Ferrin Barr Jr. (1980–1997) 
 Ron Starr (1972-1997) 
 Megumi Kudo (August 8, 1986 – April 29, 1997)
 Sivi Afi (1974–1997)
 Mike Sharpe (1973–1997)
 Tony Halme (1989- December 21, 1997)

Deaths
 January 24 - Dr. Jerry Graham, 68 
 February 4 - Ray Apollon, 72 
 February 5 – Bulldog Bob Brown, 58
 February 28 - Larry Tillman, 88
 March 24 - Dr. Bill Miller, 69
 April 17 - Mitsu Arakawa, 69
 June 19 – Stan Stasiak, 60
 June 30 – Larry O'Dea, 53
 July 24 - Brian Glover, 63
 August 16 – Plum Mariko, 29
 August 18 – Robert Swenson, 40
 August 30 - Dale Lewis (wrestler), 64
 September 10 – Fritz Von Erich, 68
 September 15 – Bulldog Brower, 63
 October 5 – Brian Pillman, 35
 November 12 – Luke Brown, 62
 December 2 - Shirley Crabtree, 67

See also
List of WCW pay-per-view events
List of WWF pay-per-view events
List of FMW supercards and pay-per-view events
List of ECW supercards and pay-per-view events

References

 
professional wrestling